Chen Chun (born 13 October 1949), also known as Sean Chen in English, is a Taiwanese politician and former Premier of the Republic of China,. He is a member of the Kuomintang.

Personal
Chen was born in Taiwan. He earned a BA degree (1971) and MA degree (1973) in law from the National Taiwan University.

Politics

FSC Chairmanship
Sean Chen's popularity grew  in Taiwan when he was the Chairman of the Financial Supervisory Commission who signed three Memoranda of Understanding with his Mainland Chinese counter parties in January 2010 in the field of Banking, Insurance and Investments. This was viewed as a major milestone in furthering economic ties with the Chinese, allowing Taiwanese financial institutions access to the Mainland's vast and fast growing markets. In a discussion with  Sam Radwan that appeared in an article in Bloomberg Businessweek he showed confidence that he would be able to achieve preferential treatment for Taiwan in what is considered by many foreign financial services institutions  to be a market where Chinese regulators have not provided a level playing field.

ROC Premiership
On 6 February 2012, Chen was appointed Premier of the Republic of China in succession to Wu Den-yih. After one year of economic challenges and considerable public criticism, he stepped down from his office on health grounds on 1 February 2013, to be replaced by the Vice Premier Jiang Yi-huah.

Cross-strait relations
In March 2012, Chen gave his view on cross-strait relations at the Legislative Yuan. He agrees to the One-China policy, and that China is the Republic of China. Chinese mainland area belongs to the same country as Taiwan area, but it's just that Mainland China is not under the effective control of the ROC government.

See also

 Premier of the Republic of China

References

|-

1949 births
Living people
Kuomintang Members of the Legislative Yuan in Taiwan
Members of the 7th Legislative Yuan
Members of the 8th Legislative Yuan
Premiers of the Republic of China on Taiwan
Politicians of the Republic of China on Taiwan from Taipei
National Taiwan University alumni
Recipients of the Order of Brilliant Star